Hafiz Wohaib Butt Memorial Football Club or simply Wohaib F.C.  is an association football club based in Lahore, Punjab, Pakistan.

It currently plays in the second division of Pakistani football. Their last top-flight season was in 2013-13 season of Pakistan Premier League, when they finished at last position, winning only one match out of thirty matches, as they scored only eight goals and conceded seventy five.

History
The club was formed in December 1982 by former international defender, ex-Pakistan Football Federation official and member of the National Assembly of Pakistan Hafiz Salman Butt in the memory of his younger brother, Hafiz Wohaib Butt.

Pakistan Premier League era
Wohaib F.C. was among the first privately operated football teams in Pakistan as well as being a founding member club of the Pakistan Premier League back in 2004. The club has a youth system that has in recent years provided players for Pakistani youth teams at various age groups as well winning many national youth competitions in the past.

Despite being a privately funded club, Wohaib F.C. is not as organised as some of government-operated department sports teams. In the 2006-07 season, Wohaib FC narrowly missed out on being relegated after finishing just one point above the relegated Habib Bank. In the 2007-08 season, they were relegated after losing 8 players to other clubs and internal destabilisation.

Wohaib F.C. won the 2011-12 Pakistan Football Federation League, earning promotion to the 2012-13 Pakistan Premier League under the captaincy of Fouad Nisar.

Asian competitions
Wohaib F.C. are the first Pakistani club to have qualified for the group stages of Asian Club Championship in 1992-93 season, where they finished in the last position after Al Wasl hammered them 10-0, and drew 1-1 to the eventual champions PAS Tehran.

Performance in AFC competitions
 Asian Club Championship: 1 appearance
1992-93: Group Stage

Current squad

External links
 Wohaib FC website

Football clubs in Pakistan
Association football clubs established in 1982
1982 establishments in Pakistan
Football in Lahore